Pikaliiva (Estonian for "Long Sand") is a subdistrict of the district of Haabersti in Tallinn, the capital of Estonia. It has a population of 2,464.

References

Subdistricts of Tallinn